Alburnoides qanati is a fish species of family Cyprinidae. It is widespread in the Pulvar River system and Kor River in Iran. Benthopelagic subtropical freshwater fish, up to 7.2 cm in length.

References 

Alburnoides
Fish described in 2009
Fish of Iran